Geretsberg is a municipality in the district Braunau am Inn in the Austrian state of Upper Austria.

Geography
Geretsberg lies in the Innviertel. About 69 percent of the municipality is forest and 27 percent farmland.

References

Cities and towns in Braunau am Inn District